South District is an urban district in Taichung, Taiwan.

History
The district used to be part of Taichung  provincial city before the merger with Taichung County to form Taichung special municipality on 25 December 2010.

Administrative divisions
Zhangchun, Zhangrong, Chenghuang, Guoguang, Nanmen, Deyi, Jishan, Jiangchuan, Xinrong, Fuxing, Fuping, Fushun, Heping, Pinghe, Nanhe, Yongxing, Yonghe, Shuyi, Gongxue, Shude, Xichuan and Chonglun Village.

Education 

 National Chung Hsing University
 Chung Shan Medical University
 YiNing High School (宜寧高中)
 National Taichung Industrial High School (台中高工)
 MingDer Girls' Senior High School (明德女中)
 Chung Lun Junior High School (崇倫國中)
 Sz-Yu Junior High School (四育國中)
 XinYi Elementary School (信義國小)
 Kuo-Kuang Elementary School (國光國小)
 He Ping Elementary School (和平國小)
 Shu Yi Elementary School (樹義國小)

Tourist attractions
 Taichung Cultural and Creative Industries Park

Transportation

Railways
 TRA Daqing Station
 TRA Wuchuan Station

Taichung Metro
 Daqing Station

Provincial Highways 
 Provincial Highway No. 1B(乙)
 Provincial Highway No. 3
 Provincial Highway No. 63

Major Roads
 Zhongming S. Rd. (忠明南路)
 Wenxin S. Rd. (文心南路)
 Wuquan S. Rd. (五權南路)
 Guoguang Rd. (國光路)
 Fuxing Rd. (復興路)

See also
 Taichung

References

External links

  

Districts of Taichung